Cesc or CESC may refer to:
 Chamundeshwari Electricity Supply Corporation, an electricity supply company in Karnataka, India
 Calcutta Electric Supply Corporation, an electricity supply company in West Bengal, India
 Cesc Fàbregas, Spanish association football player
 Cesc Gay, Spanish screenwriter and director
 , Catalan comic writer and recipient of the Creus de Sant Jordi
 Corneal epithelial stem cells